Postcards from Ireland is the fourteenth studio album released by the group Celtic Woman.

Background
On 20 April 2021, Celtic Woman announced the Postcards from Ireland tour, with Cork-born singer Muirgen O'Mahony replacing former member Mairéad Carlin who left the group in January 2021 to pursue solo projects.

On 10 September, "The Dawning of the Day" was released as the first single from the album, accompanied by a lyric video. On 8 October, "Mise Éire" was released as the second single from the album, also with a lyric video. The album was released on 29 October, and an accompanying music video for "Wild Mountain Thyme" was released on the same day.

Postcards from Ireland features vocalists Chloë Agnew, O'Mahony, Megan Walsh and instrumentalist Tara McNeill. British folk group the Longest Johns make a guest appearance on the track "Beeswing", while former member Susan McFadden returned to the group as a guest performer on the track "May it Be".

Track listing
Note: All songs arranged, orchestrated and produced by Daragh O'Toole.

PBS special and DVD release background
A television special of the same title was broadcast on PBS stations across the United States and Canada in November 2021. Directed by Irish filmmaker Donal Moloney and produced by Windmill Lane Pictures, the special consists of a subset of sixteen music videos filmed in different locations across the Republic of Ireland and Northern Ireland in mid-2021.

A gift set containing a CD, DVD and a set of postcards was made available for donations made through local stations to support airings of the special. The DVD was later made available through the official PBS website, and was released generally on 21 January 2022.

DVD track listing

Personnel
Per the liner notes:

Celtic Woman
 Chloë Agnew - vocals
 Susan McFadden - vocals
 Tara McNeill - fiddle, harp
 Megan Walsh - vocals
 Muirgen O'Mahony - vocals

Band
 Daragh O'Toole - piano, keyboards
 Kieran Leonard - drums, bodhrán drum, percussion
 Caitríona Frost - percussion
 Darragh Murphy - whistles, uilleann pipes
 John Hunt - bagpipes
 Anthony Byrne - bagpipes
 Johnny Boyle - drums, percussion
 Brian Murphy - guitar, mandolin, banjo

The Orchestra of Ireland
 Jonathan Ford - orchestra contractor
 Daragh O'Toole - orchestra leader
 David Brophy - music director, conductor

Celtic Voices Choir
 Paul McGough - choral contractor

Production
 Daragh O'Toole - producer, recording arranger
 Michael Manning - studio engineer
 Simon Gibson - mastering engineer
 Ger McDonnell - studio mixing
The Longest Johns appear courtesy of Decca Records

Charts

References

2021 video albums
Manhattan Records albums
2022 concert tours
Celtic Woman albums